Sparkle Friends is a New Zealand animated series produced by Mukpuddy Animation for New Zealand's long running children's show, What Now. The series stars the What Now presenters as children and a creature named Gun-gi, who vomits gunge, something that features heavily in What Now.

Cast
 Serena Cooper-Rongonui as herself
 Richard Mills as himself
 Tāmati Coffey as himself
 Tumehe Rongonui as himself
 Jeremy Dillon as Gun-gi and other miscellaneous characters
 Jason Gunn as Camilla and other miscellaneous characters
 Gem Knight as Princess Gem from Gungetonia
 Jarrod Wright as Roadblock
 Richard Simpson as Chafe Duffield
 Jocelyn Dell Christian as Pashmina, the Toothfairy, the Valley Girls, and Lush
 Ryan Cooper as various miscellaneous characters

Episode list

Series 1 (2006)
Series 1 ran from 7 May to 2 July 2006.

Series 2 (2007)
Series 2 ran from 9 May to 9 July 2007.

11. Return of the Gun-gi.

12. Yabba Dabba Don't!

13. Yo Ho Ho and a Bottle of Gunge
 
14. Kentucky Fried Charlie

15. Invasion of the Richie Snatchers

15. Beauty and the Yeast

17. Are We There Yeti?
 
18. Rock'em Sock'em.

19. Insert Coin Here.

20. Send Out the Clowns

Series 3 (2008)
Series 3 ran from 15 July to 2 October 2008.
"Son of a Gun-gi / Camilla at Large"
"Almost Famous / Short Fuse"
"Super Tu / Mo' Charlie Mo' Problems"
"How Now Sea Cow / Summer Knights"
"The Case of the Muddy Footprints / The Gungiest Place on Earth"

Series 4 (2009-10)
Series 4 ran from 17 November 2009 to 15 March 2010.
"Super Tu 2"
"Roadblock (Special)"
"Spooky Sunday / Rainbow Connection"
"The Girl Next Door / My Tu Front Teeth"
"Sprinkle Kids / Attack of the 50ft Toby"

Series 5 (2010-11)
Series 5 ran from 8 November 2010 to 25 July 2011.

1. Sparkle Friends Next Level Part I

2. Sparkle Friends Next Level Part II

3. The Finale!

References

External links
What Now official website
Sparkle Friends MySpace
Mukpuddy Animation official website

New Zealand children's animated television series
2006 New Zealand television series debuts
2011 New Zealand television series endings
TVNZ 2 original programming
Flash television shows